Elections to Dungannon and South Tyrone Borough Council were held on 5 May 2011 on the same day as the other Northern Irish local government elections. The election used four district electoral areas to elect a total of 22 councillors.

Election results

Note: "Votes" are the first preference votes.

Districts summary

|- class="unsortable" align="centre"
!rowspan=2 align="left"|Ward
! % 
!Cllrs
! % 
!Cllrs
! %
!Cllrs
! %
!Cllrs
! % 
!Cllrs
!rowspan=2|TotalCllrs
|- class="unsortable" align="center"
!colspan=2 bgcolor="" | Sinn Féin
!colspan=2 bgcolor="" | DUP
!colspan=2 bgcolor="" | UUP
!colspan=2 bgcolor="" | SDLP
!colspan=2 bgcolor="white"| Others
|-
|align="left"|Blackwater
|27.0
|1
|bgcolor="#D46A4C"|32.9
|bgcolor="#D46A4C"|2
|25.6
|1
|10.4
|1
|4.1
|0
|5
|-
|align="left"|Clogher Valley
|bgcolor="#008800"|31.2
|bgcolor="#008800"|1
|28.8
|2
|21.7
|1
|18.3
|1
|0.0
|0
|5
|-
|align="left"|Dungannon Town
|22.1
|2
|bgcolor="#D46A4C"|23.8
|bgcolor="#D46A4C"|2
|16.9
|1
|10.4
|0
|26.8
|1
|6
|-
|align="left"|Torrent
|bgcolor="#008800"|53.0
|bgcolor="#008800"|4
|4.9
|0
|11.7
|1
|16.1
|1
|14.3
|0
|6
|- class="unsortable" class="sortbottom" style="background:#C9C9C9"
|align="left"| Total
|34.5
|8
|21.8
|6
|18.8
|4
|13.9
|3
|11.0
|1
|22
|-
|}

District results

Blackwater

2005: 2 x DUP, 1 x Sinn Féin, 1 x UUP, 1 x SDLP
2011: 2 x DUP, 1 x Sinn Féin, 1 x UUP, 1 x SDLP
2005-2011 Change: No change

Clogher Valley

2005: 2 x Sinn Féin, 1 x DUP, 1 x UUP, 1 x SDLP
2011: 2 x DUP, 1 x Sinn Féin, 1 x UUP, 1 x SDLP
2005-2011 Change: DUP gain from Sinn Féin

Dungannon Town

2005: 2 x DUP, 2 x Sinn Féin, 1 x UUP, 1 x SDLP
2011: 2 x DUP, 2 x Sinn Féin, 1 x UUP, 1 x Independent
2005-2011 Change: Sinn Féin gain from SDLP, Independent leaves Sinn Féin

Torrent

2005: 4 x Sinn Féin, 1 x SDLP, 1 x UUP
2011: 4 x Sinn Féin, 1 x SDLP, 1 x UUP
2005-2011 Change: No change

References

Dungannon and South Tyrone Borough Council elections
Dungannon and South Tyrone